Colin Ward (born September 5, 1970) is a Canadian retired ice hockey forward.

Early life 
Ward was born in Edmonton, Alberta. He played junior hockey with the Red Deer Rustlers and New Westminster Royals. Ward was a member of the Western Michigan Broncos men's ice hockey team for four years.

Career 
After playing in the IHL and ECHL, Ward moved to the United Kingdom in 1997, signing for the Bracknell Bees. With the team, Ward won the British Ice Hockey Superleague title in 2000. He then moved to the newly-formed Belfast Giants in 2001 and won his second Superleague title in 2002 in the Giants' second year in the league. Ward retired in 2004 after seven seasons in the UK. His number 11 jersey was retired by the Belfast Giants.

External links

1970 births
Anaheim Bullfrogs players
Atlanta Fire Ants players
Atlanta Knights players
Belfast Giants players
Bracknell Bees players
Buffalo Wings (inline hockey) players
Canadian ice hockey forwards
Dayton Bombers players
HC Gardena players
Living people
Long Island Jawz players
Nashville Knights players
Ice hockey people from Edmonton
Utah Grizzlies (AHL) players
Western Michigan Broncos men's ice hockey players
Canadian expatriate ice hockey players in England
Canadian expatriate ice hockey players in Northern Ireland
Canadian expatriate ice hockey players in Italy
Canadian expatriate ice hockey players in the United States

References